The Théâtre Louvois or Salle Louvois was a theatre located at what is today 8 rue de Louvois in the 2nd arrondissement of Paris. Inaugurated in 1791 and closed in 1825, it was used by the Théâtre-Italien from 20 March 1819 to 8 November 1825. Gioachino Rossini became Director of Music on 1 December 1824.

History 
 1791–1794: building by Francescal on plans by Alexandre-Théodore Brongniart; inauguration on 16 August; known as the Théâtre de Louvois or Théâtre de la rue de Louvois up to January 1794, under the direction of Michel-André Delomel
 1794–1796: known as the Théâtre des Amis de la Patrie from 13 January 1794 to December 1796
 1796: direction Mlle Raucourt, as the Théâtre Français de la rue de Louvois' from 25 December 1796 to 10 September 1797
 1798: direction César Ribié, as the Théâtre d'Émulation from 17 April to 31 December
 1799: used by the players of the Théâtre de l'Odéon from 20 March to 12 April, under the direction Louis-Benoît Picard
 1799–1801: known as the Théâtre des Troubadours from 1 August 1799 – 20 April 1801
 1801–1808: used again from 5 May 1801 – 12 June 1808 by the players of the Théâtre de l'Odéon under Picard, then Alexandre Duval
 1804: becomes known as the Théâtre de l'Impératrice until June 1808, when the players returned to the new Odéon, taking the name with them
 1807: acquired in December by the state for use by the Paris Opéra as rehearsal space and for concerts, including some by the Concerts Spirituels
 1808: closed by order of Napoléon, it then served as a storage room for the Opéra, at that time performing in the Théâtre des Arts located just across the rue de Louvois from the Salle Louvois; communication between the two buildings was via an iron bridge over the rue de Louvois 
 1811–1812: an annex was constructed for the storage of scenery
 1819–1825: primary venue of the Théâtre-Italien
 1820: after the closing of the Salle Favart, the theatre was used for two performances as an opera house by the Opéra, while the company was awaiting the completion of the Salle Le Peletier
 1825: closing of the theatre
 1827: order issued to remove all stored scenery for the sale of the theatre
 1899: demolition

Architectural drawings of 1821

See also 
 List of former or demolished entertainment venues in Paris

Notes

Bibliography 
 Donnet, Alexis; Orgiazzi, J. (1821). Architectonographie des théâtres de Paris, plates volume, plate 12. Paris: Didot l'ainé. Scanned by Google Books. Credit: Princeton University Library.
 Hillairet, Jacques (1985). Dictionnaire historique des rues de Paris, vol. 2, 8th edition, Les Éditions de minuit, 1985, 
 Johnson, Janet (1992). "Paris, 4: 1789–1870 (v) Théâtre-Italien", vol. 3, in The New Grove Dictionary of Opera, edited by Stanley Sadie. New York: Grove, . Also at Oxford Music Online (subscription required).
 Lasalle, Albert de (1875). Les Treize Salles de l'Opéra, librairie Sartorius, 1875 (chapter X: Salle Favart (1820))
 Wild, Nicole (1989). Dictionnaire des théâtres parisiens au XIXe siècle: les théâtres et la musique. Paris: Aux Amateurs de livres. ,  (paperback). View formats and editions at WorldCat.

Opera houses in Paris
Music venues completed in 1791
Entertainment venues in Paris
Buildings and structures demolished in 1825
Demolished buildings and structures in Paris
1791 establishments in France
theatre Louvois
Buildings and structures in the 2nd arrondissement of Paris
Louvois
Buildings and structures demolished in 1899
18th-century architecture in France